Tanina  is a village in the administrative district of Gmina Herby, within Lubliniec County, Silesian Voivodeship, in southern Poland.

The village has a population of 124.

References

Tanina